This is a list of notable members of the Rajput community.

Saints

 Mirabai, a princess and celebrated saint of the Bhakti movement and a devotee of Lord Krishna

Historical figures

List of notable Rajputs up till 1947, ordered chronologically by reign.
 Rawal Jaisal Singh, King and founder of the city of Jaisalmer
 Prithviraj Chauhan, King from the Chahamana dynasty who ruled Sapadalaksha (present-day north-western India)
 Rawal Ratan Singh, King of Mewar who fought against Allauddin Khilji in the siege of Chittorgarh
 Rana Hammir Singh, King of Mewar who following an invasion by the Khilji dynasty regained control of the region, re-established the dynasty after defeating the Tughlaq dynasty, and became the first of his dynasty to use the royal title 'Rana'
 Rao Jodha, King of Marwar and founder of its capital city Jodhpur
 Rana Kumbha, King of Mewar who expanded his territory at a time when he was surrounded by enemies from Malwa Sultanate, Gujarat Sultanate and Marwar
 Rao Bika, founder and king of Bikaner, he was a son of Rao Jodha, he left Marwar to create his own kingdom
 Rao Shekha, King of Amarsar
 Rai Bular Bhatti, a Muslim Rajput who donated 18,750 acres of land to Guru Nanak
 Man Singh Tomar, King of Gwalior, who defended his kingdom for nearly two decades against relentless attacks from the Lodi dynasty
 Rana Sanga, King of Mewar and head of Rajput confederacy in Rajputana during the early 16th century
 Hasan Khan Mewati, Ruler of Mewat, he allied with Rana Sanga in the Battle of Khanwa.
 Gajpati Ujjainia, commander in the army of the Sur Empire and chieftain in the Bhojpuri region of Bihar
 Maldev Rathore, King of Marwar was an insurgent ruler against both the Sur Empire and the Mughals
 Rana Udai Singh II, King of Mewar and founder of its capital city Udaipur
 Isa Khan, a Muslim Rajput chieftain who led the Baro Bhuiyans (twelve landlords) in 16th-century Bengal, throughout his reign he resisted the Mughal attacks
 Maharana Pratap Singh, King of Mewar who was a successful insurgent ruler against the Mughals
 Chandrasen Rathore, King of Marwar who defended his kingdom for nearly two decades against relentless attacks from the Mughals
 Man Singh I, King of Amber, a state later known as Jaipur, he was a trusted general of the Mughal emperor Akbar, who included him among the Navaratnas, or the nine gems of the royal court
 Maharana Amar Singh I, King of Mewar, he was the eldest son of Maharana Pratap who continued his father's struggle against the Mughals and defeated the Mughal army sent by Jahangir in the Battle of Dewar
 Vir Singh Deo, King of Orchha, he assassinated Abul Fazl on the request of Jahangir
 Jai Singh I, King of Amber, a state later known as Jaipur, and a senior general ("Mirza Raja") of the Mughal Empire
 Amar Singh Rathore, was a nobleman affiliated to Marwar who rebelled against Shah Jahan 
 Rao Raja Chattar Sal, King of Bundi, he served Shah Jahan as head of his Hada Rajput troops, he was trusted by Dara Shikoh with governorship of Delhi, for whom he died fighting in the War of Succession against Aurangzeb in 1658
 Maharana Raj Singh I, King of Mewar, he fought against Aurangzeb's imperial forces multiple times, once by denouncing the Jizya, he also gave aid to Durgadas Rathore of Marwar during the Rathore rebellion
 Maharaja Jaswant Singh, King of Marwar, he was a trusted general of the Mughal emperor Shah Jahan
 Durgadas Rathore, was a minister of Marwar who was successful in preserving Marwar against Mughal rule
 Maharaja Chhatrasal, King of Bundelkhand, who led a successful rebellion against the Mughals and established his own independent kingdom
 Maharaja Ajit Singh, King of Marwar, he made an alliance with the Sayyid brothers against Farrukhsiyar and fought Farrukhsiyar in the Red Fort and after a night-long battle, on 28 February 1719 Farrukhsiyar was defeated and deposed.
 Banda Singh Bahadur, was a Sikh military commander of Khalsa army who assembled a fighting force and led the rebellion against the Mughals to establish Khalsa rule in Punjab
 Jai Singh II, King of Amber and founder of its capital city Jaipur
 Sansar Chand, Katoch Rajput ruler of Kangra who liberated his ancestral kingdom from Mughal rule.
 Zorawar Singh Kahluria, Kalhuria Rajput who conquered Ladakh, Baltistan, Gilgit and Western Tibet
 Maharaja Gulab Singh, first Maharaja of Jammu and Kashmir
Sir Pratap Singh of Idar, was a career British Indian Army officer, served as ADC (aide-de-camp) to Edward VII from 1887 to 1910. He commanded his regiments heroically during the First World War in France and Flanders from 1914 to 1915 and in the Palestine Mandate at Haifa and Aleppo. He was promoted to Lieutenant-General in 1916.
 Sir Bhagvatsinhji of Gondal, a modern reformist visionary, he studied Medicine at the University of Edinburgh, from where he graduated as a medical doctor in 1895.
 Maharaja Ganga Singh of Bikaner, a modern reformist visionary. During the First World War, he commanded the Bikaner Camel Corps which served in France, Egypt and Palestine. he was also the only non-White member of the British Imperial War Cabinet during World War I.
 Maharaja Hari Singh, the last ruler of Jammu and Kashmir

Freedom fighters
Raja Narain Singh, Zamindar of the Seris and Kutumba estate. Participated in the 1781 revolt in Bihar
 Kunwar Singh, ruler of Jagdishpur estate, rebel leader in the Indian rebellion of 1857 against British rule
 Rana Ratan Singh, was a rebel against British rule who was affiliated to Sodhas of Umerkot
Kushal Singh, the rebel thakur of Auwa who defeated British Army under General Lawrence during Indian rebellion of 1857
Lal Pratap Singh of Kalakankar. He was prominent leader in the Indian Rebellion of 1857 against British rule
 Babu Bhoop Singh, ruler of Kohra estate and was prominent leader in the Indian Rebellion of 1857 against the British
Rana Beni Madho, ruler of Shankarpur estate and was one of the important rebel leaders in Oudh in the revolt of 1857.
Meghar Singh Sakarwar, a rebel zamindar who participated in the rebellion of 1857.
Rai Ahmad Khan Kharal, leader of Bar rebellion in Indian Rebellion of 1857.
 Rao Gopal Singh Kharwa, erstwhile ruler of Kharwa state, was jailed for organising revolt against the British
 Thakur Roshan Singh, was an Indian revolutionary and a member of Hindustan Socialist Republican Association

Politicians of India

V. P. Singh, former Prime Minister of India (1989-1990) and former Chief minister of Uttar Pradesh.
Chandra Shekhar, former Prime Minister of India (1990-1991)
Jaswant Singh, former Minister of Defence and Minister of External Affairs
Karni Singh, former politician from Rajasthan
Dinesh Singh, former Minister of External Affairs
Bhim Singh, Jammu and Kashmir politician
Manish Sisodia, Deputy Chief Minister of Delhi
Dilip Singh Judeo, former politician from Chhattisgarh
Anugrah Narayan Sinha, former Deputy Chief Minister of Bihar
Karan Singh, former governor of Jammu and Kashmir
 Raghuvansh Prasad Singh, former Bihar politician
 Amar Singh, former Uttar Pradesh politician
 Sher Singh Rana,  Politician, founder of Rashtravadi Janlok Party.
 Deep Narayan Singh, former Chief minister of Bihar
 Harihar Singh, former Chief minister of Bihar
 Chandrashekhar Singh, former Chief minister of Bihar
 Satyendra Narayan Sinha, former Chief minister of Bihar
 Madhav Singh Solanki, former Chief minister of Gujarat
 Shankersinh Vaghela, former Chief minister of Gujarat and Union Minister of Textiles
 Thakur Ram Lal, former Chief minister of Himachal Pradesh
 Virbhadra Singh, former Chief minister of Himachal Pradesh
 Dharam Singh, former Chief minister of Karnataka
 Arjun Singh, former Chief minister of Madhya Pradesh
 Rajendra Narayan Singh Deo, former Chief minister of Odisha and member of Royal Singh Deo family
 Bhairon Singh Shekhawat, former Chief minister of Rajasthan
 Tribhuvan Narain Singh,former Chief minister of Uttar Pradesh 
 Pragya Singh Thakur, BJP politician from Bhopal
 Vir Bahadur Singh,former Chief minister of Uttar Pradesh
 Yogi Adityanath, 17th and current Chief minister of Uttar Pradesh

Indian armed forces

 General Rajendrasinhji Jadeja, former chief of the Indian Army
Brigadier Rajinder Singh, popularly known as "Saviour of Kashmir" and India's first recipient of the Maha Vir Chakra.
Shah Nawaz Khan Janjua, an officer in the Indian National Army during Second World War
 Naik Jadu Nath Singh Rathore, awarded the Param Vir Chakra
 Major Shaitan Singh, awarded the Param Vir Chakra
 Brigadier Sawai Bhawani Singh, awarded the Mahavir Chakra
 Lt Gen Hanut Singh Rathore, awarded the Maha Vir Chakra
 Colonel Kishan Singh Rathore, a war hero of the Indo-Pakistani War of 1947, was awarded Maha Vir Chakra. 
General Bipin Rawat, first Chief of Defence Staff (CDS) of India and former chief of Indian Army.
 General V.K. Singh, Indian politician and former chief of the Indian Army
 Maj Gen Anant Singh Pathania, a recipient of Maha Vir Chakra and the first Indian to receive Military Cross in the Second World War.
 Admiral Madhvendra Singh, former chief of the Indian Navy
 Lt Gen Nathu Singh Rathore, served the Indian Army from 1947 to 1954, was offered Commander-in-Chief of army post but he declined, stating that General K. M. Cariappa was senior to him and more eligible for the post.
 Hawaldar Piru Singh Shekhawat, awarded the Param Vir Chakra
 Capt Gurbachan Singh Salaria, awarded the Param Vir Chakra
 Lt Gen Sagat Singh, awarded the Padma Bhushan
 Admiral Vijai Singh Shekhawat, former chief of the Indian Navy
 Air Vice Marshal Chandan Singh Rathore, awarded the Maha Vir Chakra
 Brigadier Saurabh Singh Shekhawat, awarded the Kirti Chakra
 Lt Gen Kanwar Bahadur Singh, served the Indian Army from 1931 to 1959
 Maj Gen Kanwar Zorawar Singh, awarded the Military Cross
 Lt Kiran Shekhawat, the first woman officer of the Indian Navy to be martyred in the line of duty

Pakistani politicians and lawyers

 Zulfikar Ali Bhutto, 4th President and the 9th Prime Minister of Pakistan
Benazir Bhutto,elected twice as Prime Minister of Pakistan. 
 Allah Bux Soomro, former chief minister of Sindh
 Sir Shah Nawaz Bhutto, Prime Minister of the princely state Junagarh
Muhammad Khan Junejo, former Prime Minister of Pakistan
 Rana Chander Singh, former Federal Minister of Pakistan
 Rana Hamir Singh, former Member of Provincial Assembly of Sindh, 26th and current Rana of Umerkot, Sindh, Pakistan
 Rana Bhagwandas, former Chief Justice of Pakistan
 Chaudhry Ghulam Abbas, former Head of the Azad Kashmir government

Pakistani armed forces 
 Major Rana Shabbir Sharif, awarded the Nishan-e-Haider
 Pilot Rashid Minhas, awarded the Nishan-e-Haider
 Major Raja Aziz Bhatti, awarded the Nishan-e-Haider
 Captain Raja Muhammad Sarwar, awarded the Nishan-e-Haider
 General Tikka Khan, former Chief of the Pakistan Army
 General Raheel Sharif, former Chief of the Pakistan Army
 Raja Sakhi Daler Khan, fought for Pakistan in the 1947 Indo-Pakistan war.

Film and television

 Chaya Singh, Indian actress
 Preity Zinta, Indian film actress
 Abhimanyu Singh, Indian film and TV actor
 Kangana Ranaut, Indian film actress
 Sonal Chauhan, Indian film actress and model
 Arunoday Singh, Indian actor and poet
 Sushant Singh Rajput, former Indian TV and film actor
 Mohena Singh, Indian TV actress and member of Rewa royal family
 Sonarika Bhadoria, Indian TV actress
 Disha Patani, Indian actress
 Thakur Anoop Singh, Indian film and TV actor
 Urvashi Rautela, Indian film actress
 Vishakha Singh, Indian film actress
 Vidyut Jammwal, Indian actor
 Nakuul Mehta, Indian TV actor
 Jaspal Bhatti, Indian film and TV actor
Anurag Kashyap, Indian filmmaker

Sports

Athletics
 Milkha Singh, Indian athlete
 Paan Singh Tomar, former Indian athlete, soldier and outlaw

Cricket

 Kumar Shri Ranjitsinhji, former Indian test cricketer
 Duleepsinhji, former Indian test cricketer
 Chetan Chauhan, former Indian cricketer
 Mahendra Singh Dhoni, former Indian cricketer and captain of India across all formats
 Ravindra Jadeja, Indian cricketer

Hockey
 Dhyan Chand, former Indian field hockey captain

Boxing 
 Amir Khan, former World Champion

Wrestling
Dalip Singh Rana (popularly known as The Great Khali), WWE wrestler

Criminals
 Man Singh, the leader of Indian dacoits and a Robin Hood figure from Chambal region of India. Between 1939 and 1955, he is credited with 1,112 robberies and 185 murders, including the killing of 32 police officers.
Anandpal Singh, a most-wanted gangster with a reward of ₹10 lakh on his head, accused of multiple murders as well as extortion.

References

Rajput
Lists of Pakistani people
Rajputs